Seoul Buses are public transit buses operated by the Seoul Metropolitan Government and/or private bus operators.

Bus types
There are four types of buses: 

 Trunk Bus (Blue) : Trunk buses are operated partly by private bus companies and partly by the city government. It runs for longer distance and has access to median bus lanes connecting suburban areas to downtown Seoul. The city has taken full consideration to introducing 3 kinds of buses belonging to the Blue Bus category: articulated buses (since retired), low floor buses, and high floor buses. The blue color represents Seoul's skyline and Hangang (River), which in turn symbolize security and freedom.
 Branch Bus (Green) : Branch buses are flexibly operated by private bus companies. It runs for shorter distance connecting major subway stations or bus terminals outside downtown Seoul. It is similar to the city bus and the community shuttle bus currently in operation. The green color represents the mountains surrounding the city. 
 Rapid Bus (Red) : Rapid buses are express buses designed especially for passengers commuting between downtown Seoul and the metropolitan area. The red color represents the energy of speed. 
 Circulation Bus (Yellow) : Circulation buses will circle parts of Seoul and stop at stations near business areas, tourist areas, and shopping areas, as well as providing connections to trunk/branch buses, subway stations, and major railway stations. The color yellow was selected for its dynamic and friendly image. Circulation buses routes have been slowly discontinued, with the last remaining routes being the three Namsan loop buses.

Routes
Route numbers specify area divisions. For trunk and branch buses, the first digit indicates the area where the route begins, and the second digit indicates where the route ends. For rapid buses, the first digit is always 9, and the second digit indicates the area in which the route begins. The first digit of circulation buses indicates the area in which the bus circles. Routes that begin with an 8 are holiday or rush-hour only branch buses. For all lines, any remaining digits identify individual routes.

Numbering system for routes
The following list shows the numbering system of routes based by area. This system was created to facilitate recognition of route outlines. 

Area 0 : Central Seoul (Jongno-gu, Jung-gu, Yongsan-gu)
Area 1 : Dobong-gu, Gangbuk-gu, Seongbuk-gu, Nowon-gu. (also Uijeongbu, Yangju)
Area 2 : Dongdaemun-gu, Jungnang-gu, Seongdong-gu, Gwangjin-gu. (also Guri, Namyangju)
Area 3 : Gangdong-gu, Songpa-gu. (also Hanam, Gwangju (Gyeonggi Province))
Area 4 : Seocho-gu, Gangnam-gu. (also Seongnam, Yongin)
Area 5 : Dongjak-gu, Gwanak-gu, Geumcheon-gu. (also Anyang, Gwacheon, Uiwang, Ansan, Gunpo, Suwon)
Area 6 : Gangseo-gu, Yangcheon-gu, Yeongdeungpo-gu, Guro-gu. (also Incheon, Bucheon, Gwangmyeong, Gimpo, Siheung)
Area 7 : Eunpyeong-gu, Mapo-gu, Seodaemun-gu. (also Goyang, Paju)

Vehicles

Most buses in South Korea are domestic models and are made by Hyundai, Daewoo and Edison Motors.

In popular culture
The South Korean animated children's television series Tayo the Little Bus, which is available on Hulu, Netflix and on many stations throughout the world, is based on Seoul's bus system. Each of the four main characters is a different color (type) of bus, with the title character Tayo being a blue/trunk bus.

See also
 Seoul
 Seoul Subway
 T-money: Transportation Card System
 Upass (South Korea): Transportation Card System
 Transportation in Bundang

References

External links 
Seoul Bus homepage 

Bus transport in South Korea
Transport in Seoul